The Bevier-Wright House is a historic house located at 776 Chenango Street in Port Dickinson, Broome County, New York.

Description and history 
It was built in about 1853, and consists of three sections: a 2-story, three-by-two-bay main block; a narrower 2-story, three-bay-deep, cross-gabled perpendicular wing; and a -story, three-bay rear wing. The frame house reflects the Greek Revival style. Also on the property is a -story barn with a gable roof.

It was listed on the National Register of Historic Places on May 21, 2008.

References

Houses on the National Register of Historic Places in New York (state)
Greek Revival houses in New York (state)
Houses completed in 1853
Houses in Broome County, New York
Wooden houses in the United States
National Register of Historic Places in Broome County, New York